= Devagiri-M-Kyarkoppa =

Devagiri-M-Kyarakoppa
- Village
- Country: India
- State: Karnataka
- District: Dharwad

Government
  - Type: Panchayat raj
  - Body: Gram panchayat

Population (2011)
  - Total: 767

Languages
  - Official: Kannada
- Time zone: UTC+5:30 (IST)
- Postal code: 580007
- ISO 3166 code: IN-KA
- Vehicle registration: KA 25
- Website: karnataka.gov.in

Devagiri-M-Kyarakoppa is a village in Dharwad district of Karnataka, India.

== Demographics ==
As of the 2011 Census of India there were 139 households in Devagiri-M-Kyarkoppa and a total population of 767 consisting of 393 males and 374 females. There were 116 children ages 0-6.
